Liverpool College of Art is located at 68 Hope Street, in Liverpool, England. It is a Grade II listed building. The original building, facing Mount Street, was designed by Thomas Cook and completed in 1883. The extension along Hope Street, designed by Willink and Thicknesse, opened in 1910. The building was until 2012 owned by Liverpool John Moores University. The university's School of Art and Design moved out of the building to new premises at the Art and Design Academy in 2008. 68 Hope Street also currently houses the School of Humanities and Social Science.

Amongst its former students are John Lennon, Cynthia Lennon, Maurice Cockrill, Ray Walker, Stuart Sutcliffe, Margaret Chapman, Ruth Duckworth, Phillida Nicholson and Bill Harry. In 1975, Clive Langer, Steve Allen, Tim Whittaker, Sam Davis, Steve Lindsey, John Wood and Roy Holt (a mix of Fine Art students and tutors at the college) founded seminal 'art rock' band Deaf School and went on to sign a record deal with Warner Bros Records US after being 'discovered' by former Beatles publicist and head of Warner Bros UK at the time Derek Taylor. Deaf School are acknowledged as catalysts of the post-Beatles musical revival in the city.

Staff at the Liverpool College of Art in the late 1950s (at the time of John Lennon and Stuart Sutcliffe) included Walter Norman,Julia Carter Preston, Arthur Ballard, Charles Burton, Nicholas Horsfield, George Mayer-Marton, E. S. S. English, Alfred K. Wiffen, Austin Davies, Philip Hartas, and the college's then-principal W. L. Stevenson.

In March 2012, the Liverpool Institute for Performing Arts (LIPA) announced that it had purchased the former Liverpool College of Art building for £3.7million to expand its teaching space.

Notable alumni 
 George Adamson
 Margaret Chapman
 Helen Clapcott
 Maurice Cockrill
 Ruth Duckworth
 Bill Harry
 Roy Holt
 John Francis Kavanagh
 Edward Kelly
 Ronald William "Josh" Kirby
 Clive Langer
 John Lennon
 John Meirion Morris
 Steve Lindsey
 Alexander Mackenzie
 Lilian Rathmell
 Isabel Rawsthorne
 Sidney Sime
 Stuart Sutcliffe
 Norman Thelwell
 Ray Walker (artist)
 Geoffrey Heath Wedgwood
 John Wood
 James Stirling (architect)
 Alison Appleton (ceramics designer)

See also 
 Art school
 Art Education
 List of art schools
 List of art schools in Europe
 John Holden

References

External links 

 

 
Grade II listed buildings in Liverpool
Liverpool John Moores University
Grade II listed educational buildings
Art schools in England
Hope Street, Liverpool